Staddle stones (variations include steddle stones) were originally used as supporting bases for granaries, hayricks, game larders, etc. The staddle stones lifted the granaries above the ground thereby protecting the stored grain from vermin and water seepage. In Middle English staddle or stadle is stathel, from Old English stathol, a foundation, support or trunk of a tree. They can be mainly found in Great Britain, Norway ("stabbur"), Galicia and Asturias (Northern Spain).

Origins 

The name itself and evidence from surviving vernacular buildings with wooden 'feet' suggest that at first the staddles or supports were made of wood, such as at Peper Harow granary in Surrey. Stone staddles were longer lasting and a more reliable means of supporting structures which were sometimes a considerable weight.

The name has become integrated into the landscape with bridges, houses, farms and other structures incorporating the name 'staddle'.

Design

The staddle stones usually had a separate head and base which gave the whole structure a 'mushroom' like appearance. Different areas in the United Kingdom had different designs. The base varied from cylindrical to tapered rectangular to near triangular. Flat topped cone shaped staddle stones are to be found in parts of the Isle of Wight. The tops are flat to support the beams, however some variation exists, such as square tops, fluted designs, slate tops, etc.

A fine example is the English Granary built 1731, supported on staddle stones, which can be seen in the Weald and Downland Open Air Museum in West Sussex, UK.  Such structures were common in Southern England in the 18th century. At Higher Farm in Heathfield, Tavistock, staddle stones are part of the substantial barns built by the Duke of Bedford in the 19th century. The dressed granite stone bases have specially hewn slate tops.

The materials used depended on the stone available, giving rise to sandstone, red sandstone, granite examples, etc.

The tower mill at Reigate on the Wray Common ceased to work in 1895. The mill had a granary standing next to it, supported by a large number of staddle stones.

The Museum of Scottish Country Life at Wester Kittochside near East Kilbride has two 'Stathels', made in Edinburgh of cast iron. The structure is basically a cast iron version of a set of staddle stones with its wooden framework. These rare survivals are still in use.

Function
The base stones taper towards the top with an overlapping cap stone placed above, making it almost impossible for a rodent to climb up and into the hay or grain stored above. The air could freely circulate beneath the stored crops and this helped to keep it dry. A wood framework was placed onto the tops of the stones, the staddles being arranged in two or three rows, giving sixteen or more stones.  The hayricks, Tithe barns, granaries, etc. were built on top of this frame.

Granaries and beehives

These were often constructed with wooden weather-boards such as at Blaxland Farm in Sturry, Kent, which has nine staddles. However, if the grain was stored loose then the sides were filled in with brick nogging and light lath-and-plaster at the wall tops. Wooden steps up to the buildings were detachable and stored by hanging them up on the side of the structure. If stone or brick steps were built then the top step was not built, thus denying access to rats and other vermin. Some of these granaries had a 'cat flap' and others had a recess inside the steps which served as a dog kennel.

Most granaries were used for the storage of two or three separate crops, having a capacity of 500 to 2500 bushels. The arrangement of the stones to support the structure and its weight when in use, required nine, twelve or sixteen staddles. The production of staddles was therefore a fairly significant local industry. Small granaries could make do with five, one being in the middle. The Upper Hexford granary in Oxfordshire uses thirty-six staddles.

Beehives were often set on top of staddle stones to keep out predators and provide dry and airy conditions.

Game larders
Small staddle stones were used to support small roofed box-shaped game larders which were used on the larger estates for storage of game, such as pheasant, brought back by shooting parties, etc.

Barns
Timber-framed barns raised onto staddle stones were sometimes found in the south of England. Apart from the usual benefits it seems that some correlation between this barn type and the builder being a tenant exists. Being on staddles such barns remained the property of the tenant. In Galicia and Asturias (NW Spain), these barns are called hórreos.

Landscape gardening
Staddles are often found in architectural salvage yards as they may be seen as attractive structures. They are also sold new, being made from moulded concrete. Chainsaws are used to produce wooden 'staddle stones' for use as garden seats or ornaments. In this context the staddle stones are often called mushroom stones.

Conservation
Staddle stones are often well over a century old and have developed a good lichen 'patina' with slow and fast growing species adhering to the surfaces. They are better not cleaned as the lichen flora is well worth preserving to add to the biodiversity of a garden scene.

Surveyors marks
Old land deeds in northeastern United States often refer to Oak Staddle or Walnut Staddle.  These deeds are from the late 18th century to the middle 19th century.  Either the owners would cut a tree leaving the stump and request that the surveyors measure to it, or the surveyor would measure out to the location of a new lot corner and a staddle would be inserted into the ground like a boundary stone.

See also
 The Lands of Cunninghamhead. An example of the rare Scottish Staddle Stone.
 Foundation (engineering)
 Hórreo
 Latte stone
 Museum of Scottish Rural Life, Kittochside

Notes

References

External links
 Staddle stones and Game Larders
 Granary on Staddle Stone
 Staddle Stones - Salvage Yards
 Reproduction and Antique Staddle Stones
 Large collection of staddle stone images
  A Researcher's Guide to Local History terminology

Agricultural buildings
Building stone
Shallow foundations
Architectural elements